Kanak Kanti Barua is a Bangladeshi neurosurgeon and academic. He has served as the 10th  Vice Chancellor of Bangabandhu Sheikh Mujib Medical University(BSMMU).

Early life and education 
Barua was born in 1953. He passed Secondary School Certificate from Comilla Board in 1968 and Higher Secondary Certificate from Dhaka College under Dhaka Board in 1970. He passed MBBS from Dhaka Medical College in 1977. He obtained FCPS from Bangladesh College of Physicians and Surgeons in 1990. He earned MS in Neurosurgery from University of Dhaka in 2003 and conferred Ph.D. in 2004 from Kobe University Kobe University.

Career 
Prof. Barua joined the then IPGMR (Now Bangabandhu Sheikh Mujib Medical University) in 1979. He served as Chairman of Department of Neurosurgery and also as the Dean of Faculty of Surgery at this University. for consecutive three terms. He was appointed as 10th Vice Chancellor of BSMMU in March 2018. He also served as President of Bangladesh College of Physicians and Surgeons (BCPS) from 2017 to 2019. Prof. Barua also served as Senior Vice-President of BCPS from 2015 to 2017 and was Honorary Secretary from 2009 to 2015 for consecutive three terms. He also served as Syndicate Member of Bangabandhu Sheikh Mujib Medical University from 2010 to 2018 and also Chattogram Medical University and Rajshahi Medical University at different times.

Publications 
Barua published more than 122 papers in different national and international reputed journals.

Affiliations with professional organisations 
Barua served as President of Bangladesh Society of Neurosurgeons (BSNS) for five terms and was also the Founder Secretary General of the society. He also worked as Vice-President of Asian Congress of Neurological Surgeons from 1997 to 2004 and was Secretary of the Congress in 2000–2002. He was the President of SAARC Society of Neurosurgeons. He served as the President of Society of Surgeons of Bangladesh from 2012 to 2014. He was the President of South Asian Surgical Care Society from 2015 to 2017. He served as President of Bangladesh Association of Sports Medicine from 2014 to 2021 and Vice-President from 2000 to 2014. In addition, he was also the Secretary General of Bangladesh Association of Sports Medicine from 1986 to 2000. He also served as Chairman of Medical and Antidoping Committee of Bangladesh Olympic Association from March 2010 to April 2013. He was the Chairman of Antidoping Committee and Co-convenor of the Medical Committee of 11th South Asian Games. Prof. Barua served as Chairman of Dhaka Medical College Alumni Trust. He was Member of the Management Board of Bangladesh Red Crescent Society from May to October 2001. Barua served in different capacities during last three decades and now serving as Senior Vice-President of Bangladesh Medical Association. He also served as acting President of the Teachers' Association of Bangabandhu Sheikh Mujib Medical University.

Awards and recognition 
Barua was awarded with fellowship of International College of Surgeons from USA in 1993. He was awarded with honorary FSLCS from Sri Lanka College of Surgeons, Sri Lanka and honorary FCPS from College of Physicians and Surgeons Pakistan in 2012. He received Professr PS Ramani lifetime achievement award in 2019. He was awarded by BMA North American Chapter at New Orleans on 26 July 2018 for Outstanding Performance and service in the field of Neurosurgery. Prof. Barua Received Atish Dipankar Peace Gold Medal in 2018. He was also awarded U Gun Meju-Krinshna Chandra Choudhury Sharnapadak in 2019. Prof. Barua was conferred Shadhinata Padak (Independence Award), the highest civil award of Bangladesh in 2022.

References 

Bangladeshi neurosurgeons
1953 births
Dhaka Medical College alumni
Bangabandhu Sheikh Mujib Medical University faculty
Living people